Federal Highway Police may refer to:
Federal Highway Police (Brazil)